Liborio Salvatore Bellomo (born January 8, 1957) is an American mobster and boss of the Genovese crime family. He served in the 116th Street Crew of Saverio "Sammy Black" Santora and was initiated in 1977. His father was a soldier and close to Anthony "Fat Tony" Salerno. In 1990, Kenneth McCabe, then-organized crime investigator for the United States attorney's office in Manhattan, identified Bellomo as "acting boss" of the crime family following the indictment of Vincent Gigante in the "Windows Case". In June 1996, Bellomo was indicted on charges of extortion, labor racketeering and for ordering the deaths of Ralph DeSimone in 1991 and Antonio DiLorenzo in 1988; DeSimone was found shot 5 times in the trunk of his car at LaGuardia Airport and DiLorenzo was shot and killed in the backyard of his home. Since around 2016, Bellomo was recognised, most likely, to be official boss of the Genovese family.

Family
Bellomo is the son of Salvatore Bellomo. He is the double cousin of Genovese associate Liborio Thomas Bellomo; their fathers are brothers and their mothers are sisters. This has led law enforcement to confuse their identities on several occasions. In 1997, Liborio Thomas Bellomo swore in an affidavit that he was guilty of federal charges instead of Bellomo.

Bellomo has three sons and one daughter.

Acting boss and indictment
In 1990, after Vincent Gigante's indictment in the Windows Case, Bellomo was appointed acting boss of the Genovese family. On June 11, 1996, Bellomo was indicted on Racketeer Influenced and Corrupt Organizations Act (RICO) charges, including the murders of mobster Ralph DeSimone and Antonio DiLorenzo, extortion, and labor racketeering. DiLorenzo was found shot to death in the backyard of his home in West New York, New Jersey. DeSimone was found in the trunk of his car at LaGuardia Airport in Queens, shot five times. Both DeSimone and DiLorenzo were murdered because the Genovese leadership thought they were government informants. 

Bellomo's lawyers stated that their client passed two polygraph tests in which he denied killing anyone. FBI agents shaved Bellomo's head, looking for evidence that Bellomo had used lithium to beat the polygraph machines. 

In February 1997, prosecutors dropped the DeSimone and DiLorenzo murder charges and offered Bellomo a chance to plead guilty to extorting payoffs from a construction union and a garbage hauling company. Bellomo accepted the deal and was sentenced to 10 years in prison.

Prison and more indictments

On July 13, 2001, the imprisoned Bellomo was indicted on money laundering charges related to the Genovese family's involvement in the waterfront rackets and control of the ILA. Bellomo was accused of hiding money stolen from the ILA's members pension fund account between 1996 and 1997. Bellomo again pleaded guilty to lesser charges, pushing back his scheduled release date in 2004. 

On February 23, 2006, Bellomo and over 30 Genovese family members were indicted on more racketeering charges. Bellomo was specifically charged with ordering the 1998 murder of Ralph Coppola, the acting captain of Bellomo's crew and Bellomo's good friend. On September 16, 1998, Coppola disappeared a few weeks before his sentencing on fraud charges and was never found. Government witness Peter Peluso, a former lawyer for the Genovese family, stated that he had transported a message from Bellomo in prison ordering Coppola's murder. Some accounts state that Coppola was disrespectful, others say that he was stealing family profits.

According to the Bellomo indictment:

Peluso pleaded guilty to his role in the murder. However, the government had no proof that Peluso had indeed met with Bellomo. With insufficient evidence to press the murder charge against Bellomo, the government offered him a plea bargain for mail fraud. Bellomo accepted and received one additional year in prison. His daughter Sabrina, is credited with helping get her father a light sentence with a tearful plea to judge Lewis A. Kaplan. Due to his 12-year imprisonment, he missed her high school, college, and law school graduations.

Release from prison

On December 1, 2008, Bellomo was released from prison after serving 12 years.

References

Further reading
Butler, Gregory A. Disunited Brotherhoods: Race, Racketeering and the Fall of the New York Construction Unions. Lincoln: iUniverse, 2006. 
Jacobs, James B., Coleen Friel and Robert Radick. Gotham Unbound: How New York City Was Liberated from the Grip of Organized Crime. New York: NYU Press, 1999. 
Milhorn, H. Thomas. Crime: Computer Viruses to Twin Towers. Boca Raton, Florida: Universal Publishers, 2005. 
Raab, Selwyn. Five Families: The Rise, Decline, and Resurgence of America's Most Powerful Mafia Empires. New York: St. Martin Press, 2005. 
Theoharis, Athan G. (ed.) The FBI: A Comprehensive Reference Guide. Phoenix: Oryx Press, 1999. 
United States. Congress. Senate. Committee on Governmental Affairs. Permanent Subcommittee on Investigations. Organized Crime: 25 Years After Valachi: Hearings Before the Permanent Subcommittee on Investigations, 1988.

External links
"19 Indicted in Blow to Genovese Mob",New York Times, June 12, 1996
"Barney, Mob Suspect, Says He's the Wrong Barney" New York Times, October 19, 1998
United States of America vs. Liborio Bellomo, United States District Court Southern District of New York, 2006-2-23
 thelaborers.net

1957 births
Living people
Bellomo, Liberio
Genovese crime family
Bosses of the Genovese crime family
American crime bosses
People from Pelham Manor, New York